Orinocodoras eigenmanni is the only species in the genus Orinocodoras of the catfish (order Siluriformes) family Doradidae. This species is endemic to Venezuela where it is found in the Orinoco River basin and reaches a length of  SL.

References

Doradidae
Fish of South America
Monotypic fish genera
Taxa named by George S. Myers
Fish described in 1927